Marietta is a village in Fulton County, Illinois, United States. The population was 112 at the 2010 census, down from 150 at the 2000 census.

Geography

Demographics

As of the census of 2000, there were 150 people, 56 households, and 40 families residing in the village. The racial makeup of the village was 98.67% White and 1.33% Native American.

There were 56 households, out of which 32.1% had children under the age of 18 living with them, 62.5% were married couples living together, 7.1% had a female householder with no husband present, and 26.8% were non-families. 23.2% of all households were made up of individuals, and 3.6% had someone living alone who was 65 years of age or older. The average household size was 2.68 and the average family size was 3.05.

In the village, the population was spread out, with 20.7% under the age of 18, 16.0% from 18 to 24, 24.0% from 25 to 44, 28.0% from 45 to 64, and 11.3% who were 65 years of age or older. The median age was 32 years. For every 100 females, there were 100.0 males. For every 100 females age 18 and over, there were 108.8 males.

References

Villages in Fulton County, Illinois
Villages in Illinois